The 2005–06 Russian Superleague season was the tenth season of the Russian Superleague, the top level of ice hockey in Russia. 18 teams participated in the league, and Ak Bars Kazan won the championship. This year, the league decided to expand the playoff field from 8 teams to 16, and did away with the third place series.

Standings

Playoffs

External links
Season on hockeyarchives.ru

Russian Superleague seasons
1